Our Emperor (German: Unser Kaiser) is a 1933 Austria period comedy film directed by Jacob Fleck and Luise Fleck and starring Karl Ehmann, Alfred Neugebauer and Susi Lanner. It takes place during the reign of Franz Joseph I of Austria. Location shooting took place in Bad Ischl and at the Burgtheater and Lainzer Tiergarten in Vienna.

Cast
 Karl Ehmann as Emperor Franz Joseph I.
 Alfred Neugebauer as Grand Duke Ivan
 Susi Lanner as Duchess Vera, his daughter
 Lizzi Holzschuh as Xenia Kyrillova
 Fred von Bohlen as Duke Ferdinand Rohmberg
 Georg Alexander as Baron Leopold Witzdorf
 Richard Godai as 	Ketterl, royal chamber servant
 Otto Hartmann as 	Official in ministry
 Hilde Koller as Royal cook
 John Mylong as 	Royal counsellor 
 Hansi Niese as	Frau Hartinger, his wife
 Wilhelm Schich as Peter Hartinger, head forest ranger
 Leo Slezak as 	Royal cook
 Gretl Theimer as 	Hartinger's daughter, Franzi
 Anton Tiller as 	Grandduke Peter Stefan
 Robert Valberg as 	Hofrat des Ministeriums
 Egon von Jordan as 	Anton Kneidinger, Forest ranger

References

Bibliography 
 Von Dassanowsky, Robert. Screening Transcendence: Film Under Austrofascism and the Hollywood Hope, 1933-1938. Indiana University Press, 2018

External links 
 

1933 films
1933 comedy films
Austrian comedy films
1930s historical films
Austrian historical films
1930s German-language films
Films directed by Jacob Fleck
Films directed by Luise Fleck
Austrian black-and-white films
Films shot in Vienna
Films set in Vienna